Gearoid O’Connor is an Irish hurler who plays for Tipperary Senior Championship club Moyne-Templetuohy and at inter-county level with the Tipperary senior hurling team.

Career
During the 2022 season, O’Connor made his senior debut for Tipperary, coming on as a substitute in round 2 of the 2022 Munster Senior Hurling Championship against Clare on 24 April.

On 4 February 2023, O'Connor made his league debut for Tipperary in the opening round of the 2023 National Hurling League against Laois and scored eleven points in the game as Tipperary won by 2-32 to 0-18.

Honours

Tipperary
All-Ireland Under-20 Hurling Championship (1): 2019
Munster Under-20 Hurling Championship (1): 2019

University of Limerick
Fitzgibbon Cup (1): 2023

References

Living people
Tipperary inter-county hurlers
Year of birth missing (living people)